"Boom" (stylized in all caps) is a song by American rock band X Ambassadors. It was released as the lead single from their second studio album, Orion, on January 25, 2019.

Composition
According to TuneBat.com, "Boom" is written in the key of E minor and has a tempo of 108 beats per minute.

Music video
The music video for "Boom" opens with the three members of the band wearing outfits that resemble construction site uniforms. Lights in the background flash, spelling out "boom" in braille.

Right before the bridge, an overhead light falls on the frontman, Sam Harris, knocking him out. He gets up and begins to perform again with a bleeding temple.

Personnel

X Ambassadors 
 Sam Harris – lead vocals, guitar
 Casey Harris – backing vocals, keyboards, synthesizers
 Adam Levin – drums, percussion

Additional musicians 
 Ricky Reed – additional guitars and bass guitar

Critical reception
Reception of "Boom" was generally positive. In a review of Orion, Mark Kennedy of Associated Press calls the song "infectious." Kaitlyn Sperduto of Soundigest describes the song as having a "dance/pop vibe." Ky Kasselman says the song has a "classic X Ambassadors feel", with a "catchy beat and repetitive lyrics."

In other media
 The song was used as the official theme song for the 2019 edition of WWE Stomping Grounds.
 The song was briefly played in the 2019 Nickelodeon Movies film Playing with Fire.
 The song was used in the 2020 film Sonic the Hedgehog during the bar fight bullet time sequence.
 The song was used in the in-game EA Trax for the ice hockey videogame NHL 20
 The song was played during the closing credits of the NFL Films 2021 film NFL Championship Chase.
 This song was used in the intro to the Fox Big Noon Kickoff show in 2021. (2021 college football) /Fox/NCAA/
 This song was used in the soundtrack for NASCAR 21: Ignition.

Charts

Weekly charts

Year-end charts

References

2019 singles
2019 songs
X Ambassadors songs
Kidinakorner singles
Interscope Records singles